Abdullahi Ali Afrah, born in Somalia, was a Canadian immigrant who returned to Mogadishu as a leader in the Union of Islamic Courts (UIC). He was killed 1 July 2008 in a battle with the Ethiopian troops in Matabaan, Hiiraan, Somalia.

Early life 
Afrah was born in Ceelgaras, Somalia. He left there with his parents to Mogadishu when he was five years old.

After he got his master's degree, Asparo moved to Toronto, Ontario, Canada, where he stayed for ten more years.

Education 
Afrah got his bachelor's degree in Agricultural from Lafoole University in 1983, and his master's degree in Crop science from Texas Tech University in 1986. He also got a bachelor's degree in the Islamic studies from the University of Science and Technology, Sana'a in 2005. He joined a variety of other universities but did not complete.

Canada 
Afrah moved to Toronto following the outbreak of the Somali Civil War in 1991, became a Canadian citizen and worked as a security guard with the Toronto Catholic District School Board, before operating a Somalia wire transfer service, and eventually co-owning a grocery store on Dundas Street West.

Return to Somalia 
In 1996, Asparo moved back to Somalia with his family.

"I have been there, just like everybody else, working and trying to make a good life. I tried my best and when I finished my intention to stay there I just moved back to Somalia", Afrah said, during a telephone interview with National Post.

He took his wife and children back to Mogadishu in 1997, where he held a senior position in the consultative council of the Union of Islamic Courts. Afrah's support of the UIC led William Kaplan to brand him a "Taliban wannabe" in December 2006.

After the UIC were defeated in the end of 2006, Afrah stayed behind in Mogadishu. In a telephone interview with Canadian journalist Michelle Shephard, Afrah said that "the only solution is that Ethiopia should get out of Somalia peacefully, or with force," and he vowed that "they will be out, either willingly or unwillingly."

Death 
On 1 July 2008, on his way back from his birthplace (Ceelgaras), Asparo was killed by the Ethiopian troops during a violent fighting in central Somalia, in a place called Matabaan, in Hiiraan province.

References

2008 deaths
Somalian emigrants to Canada
Somalian Islamists
Canadian Muslims
Somalian Muslims
Lafoole University alumni
Texas Tech University alumni
University of Science and Technology, Sanaa alumni
1953 births
Deaths by firearm in Somalia